Wandepanga Ismahila Ouédraogo (born 5 November 1999) is a Burkinabé professional footballer who plays as a midfielder for Greek Super League 2 club PAOK B and the Burkina Faso national team.

International career
Ouédraogo debuted for the Burkina Faso national team in a 1–0 2020 African Nations Championship qualification win over Ghana on 22 September 2019.

References

External links

1999 births
Living people
Sportspeople from Ouagadougou
Burkinabé footballers
Burkina Faso international footballers
Burkinabé Premier League players
Association football midfielders
21st-century Burkinabé people
2021 Africa Cup of Nations players
KOZAF players
Burkina Faso A' international footballers
2020 African Nations Championship players
PAOK FC players
Volos N.F.C. players
Burkinabé expatriate sportspeople in Greece
Expatriate footballers in Greece
Burkinabé expatriate footballers
AS Douanes (Burkina Faso) players